Embryo Records was a jazz and rock record label founded by Herbie Mann as a division of Atlantic Records, itself distributed by the Atlantic subsidiary Cotillion Records. The label released albums in the years 1969 through 1977.

Discography

See also
Herbie Mann discography

References

Embryo Records discography

American record labels
Jazz record labels
Atlantic Records